Steffi Graf was the defending champion but lost in the semifinals to Gabriela Sabatini.

Martina Navratilova won in the final 6–0, 6–2 against Sabatini.

Seeds
A champion seed is indicated in bold text while text in italics indicates the round in which that seed was eliminated. The top eight seeds received a bye to the second round.

  Steffi Graf (semifinals)
  Martina Navratilova (champion)
  Gabriela Sabatini (final)
  Claudia Kohde-Kilsch (semifinals)
  Zina Garrison (quarterfinals)
  Katerina Maleeva (quarterfinals)
  Mary Joe Fernández (second round)
 n/a
  Sandra Cecchini (third round)
  Isabel Cueto (first round)
  Jana Novotná (second round)
  Judith Wiesner (second round)
  Helen Kelesi (third round)
  Bettina Fulco (first round)
 n/a
 n/a

Draw

Finals

Top half

Section 1

Section 2

Bottom half

Section 3

Section 4

External links
 ITF tournament edition details

Amelia Island Championships
1988 WTA Tour